Queen of the Blues is an album by the American blues singer Koko Taylor, released in 1985.

The album was nominated for a Grammy Award, in the "Best Traditional Blues Recording" category.

Production
The album was produced by Taylor, Criss Johnson, and Bruce Iglauer. Taylor used her Blues Machine Band on the album, with guest turns by Son Seals, Albert Collins, Lonnie Brooks, and James Cotton. "Flamin' Mamie" was written by Willie Dixon.

Critical reception

The Philadelphia Inquirer deemed the album "tough, shouted blues by one of the genre's most vehement practitioners." The Kingston Whig-Standard thought that Taylor "comes across as a gruff earth mother," and noted that her guitar player, Criss Johnson, "more than holds his own on his solos" despite the many famous guest musicians. 

The New York Times wrote that Taylor's "penetrating growl is menacing on the Willie Dixon stomp 'Evil', and self-assured on 'The Hunter'." The Columbus Dispatch concluded that "Taylor is in superb form, belting out ballads about passion, slow blues about broken hearts and barroom romance rockers."

AllMusic thought that "Taylor's gritty 'I Cried like a Baby' and a snazzy remake of Ann Peebles' 'Come to Mama' are among the many highlights."

Track listing

References

Koko Taylor albums
1985 albums
Alligator Records albums